Lycophotia erythrina is a moth of the  family Noctuidae. It is found around the Mediterranean Sea and Atlantic Ocean coast of Europe in Spain, Portugal, Southern France,  Northern Italy and Albania.

It has a wingspan of 26–33 mm. Adults are on wing from May to July depending on the location.

The larvae feed on Erica species.

External links
Species info
Lepiforum.de

Lycophotia
Moths of Europe
Taxa named by Gottlieb August Wilhelm Herrich-Schäffer